Reno is a city in the northwest section of the U.S. state of Nevada, along the Nevada-California border, about  north from Lake Tahoe, known as "The Biggest Little City in the World". Known for its casino and tourism industry, Reno is the county seat and largest city of Washoe County and sits in the High Eastern Sierra foothills, in the Truckee River valley, on the eastern side of the Sierra Nevada. The Reno metro area (along with the neighboring city Sparks) occupies a valley colloquially known as the Truckee Meadows which because of large-scale investments from Greater Seattle and San Francisco Bay Area companies such as Amazon, Tesla, Panasonic, Microsoft, Apple, and Google has become a new major technology center in the United States.

The city is named after Civil War Union Major General Jesse L. Reno, who was killed in action during the American Civil War at the Battle of South Mountain, on Fox's Gap.

Reno is part of the Reno–Sparks metropolitan area, the second-most populous metropolitan area in Nevada after the Las Vegas Valley. Known as Greater Reno, it includes Washoe, Storey, Lyon Counties, the independent city and state capital, Carson City, as well as parts of Placer and Nevada Counties in California. The city proper had a population of 264,165 at the 2020 census.

History

Archaeological finds place the eastern border for the prehistoric Martis people in the Reno area. As early as the mid-1850s, a few pioneers settled in the Truckee Meadows, a relatively fertile valley through which the Truckee River made its way from Lake Tahoe to Pyramid Lake. In addition to subsistence farming, these early residents could pick up business from travelers along the California Trail, which followed the Truckee westward, before branching off towards Donner Lake, where the formidable obstacle of the Sierra Nevada began.

Gold was discovered in the vicinity of Virginia City in 1850, and a modest mining community developed, but the discovery of silver in 1859 at the Comstock Lode led to a mining rush, and thousands of emigrants left their homes, bound for the West, hoping to find a fortune.

To provide the necessary connection between Virginia City and the California Trail, Charles W. Fuller built a log toll bridge across the Truckee River in 1859. A small community that  served travelers soon grew near the bridge. After two years, Fuller sold the bridge to Myron C. Lake, who continued to develop the community by adding a grist mill, kiln, and livery stable to the hotel and eating house. He renamed it "Lake's Crossing". Most of what is present-day western Nevada was formed as the Nevada Territory from part of Utah Territory in 1861.

By January 1863, the Central Pacific Railroad (CPRR) had begun laying tracks east from Sacramento, California, eventually connecting with the Union Pacific Railroad at Promontory, Utah, to form the First transcontinental railroad. Lake deeded land to the CPRR in exchange for its promise to build a depot at Lake's Crossing. In 1864, Washoe County was consolidated with Roop County, and Lake's Crossing became the county's largest town. Lake had earned himself the title "founder of Reno". Once the railroad station was established, the town of Reno officially came into being on May 9, 1868. CPRR construction superintendent Charles Crocker named the community after Major General Jesse Lee Reno, a Union officer killed in the Civil War at the Battle of South Mountain.

In 1871, Reno became the county seat of the newly expanded Washoe County, replacing the county seat in Washoe City. However, political power in Nevada remained with the mining communities, first Virginia City and later Tonopah and Goldfield.

The extension of the Virginia and Truckee Railroad to Reno in 1872 provided a boost to the new city's economy. In the following decades, Reno continued to grow and prosper as a business and agricultural center and became the principal settlement on the transcontinental railroad between Sacramento and Salt Lake City.
As the mining boom waned early in the 20th century, Nevada's centers of political and business activity shifted to the nonmining communities, especially Reno and Las Vegas. Nevada is still the third-largest gold producer in the world, after South Africa and Australia; the state yielded 6.9% of the world's supply in 2005 world gold production.

The Reno Arch was erected on Virginia Street in 1926 to promote the upcoming Transcontinental Highways Exposition of 1927. The arch included the words "Nevada's Transcontinental Highways Exposition" and the dates of the exposition. After the exposition, the Reno City Council decided to keep the arch as a permanent downtown gateway, and Mayor E.E. Roberts asked the citizens of Reno to suggest a slogan for the arch. No acceptable slogan was received until a $100 prize was offered, and G.A. Burns of Sacramento was declared the winner on March 14, 1929, with "Reno, the Biggest Little City in the World".

Reno took a leap forward when the state of Nevada legalized open gambling on March 19, 1931, along with the passage of even more liberal divorce laws than places  such as Hot Springs, Arkansas, offered. The statewide push for legal Nevada gaming was led by Reno entrepreneur Bill Graham, who owned the Bank Club Casino in Reno, which was on Center Street. No other state offered legalized casino gaming like Nevada had in the 1930s, and casinos such as the Bank Club and Palace were popular. A few states had legal parimutuel horse racing, but no other state had legal casino gambling. The new divorce laws, passed in 1927, allowed people to divorce each other after six weeks of residency, instead of six months. People wishing to divorce stayed in hotels, houses, and/or dude ranches. Many local businesses in Reno started catering to these visitors, such as R. Herz & Bro, a jewelry store that offered ring resetting services to the recently divorced to El Cortez Hotel, which was built specifically to cater to the high number of wedded couples seeking divorces in Nevada. Most people left Nevada when their divorces were finalized.

Within a few years, the Bank Club, owned by George Wingfield, Bill Graham, and Jim McKay, was the state's largest employer and the largest casino in the world. Wingfield owned most of the buildings in town that housed gaming and took a percentage of the profits, along with his rent.

Ernie Pyle once wrote in one of his columns, "All the people you saw on the streets in Reno were obviously there to get divorces." In Ayn Rand's novel The Fountainhead, published in 1943, the New York-based female protagonist tells a friend, "I am going to Reno," which is taken as a different way of saying "I am going to divorce my husband." Among others,  Belgian-French writer Georges Simenon, at the time living in the U.S., came to Reno in 1950  to divorce his first wife.

The divorce business eventually died after about 1970, as the other states fell in line by passing their own laws easing the requirements for divorce, but gambling continued as a major Reno industry. While gaming pioneers such as "Pappy" and Harold Smith of Harold's Club and Bill Harrah of the soon-to-dominate Harrah's Casino set up shop in the 1930s, the war years of the 1940s cemented Reno as the place to play for two decades. Beginning in the 1950s, the need for economic diversification beyond gaming fueled a movement for more lenient business taxation.

At 1:03 pm, on February 5, 1957, two explosions, caused by natural gas leaking into the maze of pipes and ditches under the city, and an ensuing fire, destroyed five buildings in the vicinity of Sierra and First Streets along the Truckee River. The disaster killed two people and injured 49. The first explosion hit under the block of shops on the west side of Sierra Street (now the site of the Century Riverside), the second, across Sierra Street, now the site of the Palladio.

The presence of a main east–west rail line, the emerging interstate highway system, favorable state tax climate, and relatively inexpensive land created good conditions for warehousing and distribution of goods.

In the 1980s, Indian gaming rules were relaxed, and starting in 2000, Californian Native casinos began to cut into Reno casino revenues. Major new construction projects have been completed in the Reno and Sparks areas. Reno also is an outdoor recreation destination, due to its proximity to the Sierra Nevada, Lake Tahoe, and numerous ski resorts in the region.

In 2018, the city officially changed its flag after a local contest was held. In recent years, the Reno metro area − spurred by large-scale investments from Greater Seattle and San Francisco Bay Area companies such as Amazon, Tesla, Panasonic, Microsoft, Apple, and Google − has become a new major technology center in the United States.

Geography

Environmental considerations

Wetlands are an important part of the Reno/Tahoe area. They act as a natural filter for the solids that come out of the water treatment plant. Plant roots absorb nutrients from the water and naturally filter it. Wetlands are home to over 75% of the species in the Great Basin. However, the area's wetlands are at risk of being destroyed due to development around the city. While developers build on top of the wetlands they fill them with soil, destroying the habitat they create for the plants and animals. Washoe County has devised a plan that will help protect these ecosystems: mitigation. In the future, when developers try to build over a wetland, they will be responsible for creating another wetland near Washoe Lake.

The Truckee River is Reno's primary source of drinking water. Before the water goes to the homes around the Reno area, it must go to one of two water treatment plants, Chalk Bluff or Glendale Water Treatment Plant. To help save water, golf courses in Reno have been using treated effluent water rather than treated water from one of Reno's water plants.

The Reno-Sparks wastewater treatment plant discharges tertiary-treated effluent to the Truckee River. In the 1990s, this capacity was increased from 20 to 30 million U.S. gallons (70 to 110 million liters) per day. While treated, the effluent contains suspended solids, nitrogen, and phosphorus, aggravating water-quality concerns of the river and its receiving waters of Pyramid Lake. Local agencies working with the Environmental Protection Agency have developed several watershed management strategies to accommodate this expanded discharge. To accomplish this successful outcome, the DSSAM model was developed and calibrated for the Truckee River to analyze the most cost-effective available management strategy set.  The resulting management strategies included measures such as land use controls in the Lake Tahoe basin, urban runoff controls in Reno and Sparks, and best management practices for wastewater discharge.

The Reno area is often subject to wildfires that cause property damage and sometimes loss of life. In August 1960, the Donner Ridge fire resulted in a loss of electricity to the city for four days. In November 2011, arcing from powerlines caused a fire in Caughlin in southwest Reno that destroyed 26 homes and killed one man. Just two months later,  a fire in Washoe Drive sparked by fireplace ashes destroyed 29 homes and killed one woman. Around 10,000 residents were evacuated, and a state of emergency was declared. The fires came at the end of Reno's longest recorded dry spell.

Geology

Numerous faults exist throughout the region. Most of these are normal (vertical motion) faults associated with the uplift of the various mountain ranges, including the Sierra Nevada.

In February 2008, an earthquake swarm began to occur, lasting for several months,  with the largest quake registering at 4.9 on the Richter magnitude scale, although some geologic estimates put it at 5.0. The earthquakes were centered on the Somersett community in western Reno near Mogul and Verdi. Many homes in these areas were damaged.

The unique high desert geological features cause many to "Describe Nevada as a rockhound's paradise...access to millions of acres of government land allows geologist, miners and amateur rockhounds in Nevada to hunt to their hearts content... able to find agate, opal, jasper, fossils, fluorescent minerals, obsidian, chalcedony, wonders tone, malachite, petrified wood, limb cast, and much more means paradise."

Climate
Reno sits in the rain shadow of the Sierra Nevada mountain range. Annual rainfall averages . Reno features a cold semi-arid climate (Köppen: BSk) due to its low evapotranspiration stemming from its moderate annual average temperature and the concentration of precipitation in the cooler, less-sunny months. The city experiences cool to cold winters, and hot summers. Winter snowfall is usually light to moderate, but can be heavy some days, averaging  annually. The mountains of the Virginia Range to the east can receive more summer thunderstorms and precipitation, and around twice as much annual snowfall above . However, snowfall increases in the Virginia Range are less dramatic as elevation climbs than in the Carson Range to the west, because the Virginia Range is well within the rain shadow of the Sierra Nevada and Carson Range.

Most rainfall occurs in winter and spring. The city has 300 days of sunshine per year. Summer thunderstorms can occur between April and October. The eastern side of town and the mountains east of Reno tend to be prone to thunderstorms more often, and these storms may be severe because an afternoon downslope west wind, called a "Washoe Zephyr", can develop in the Sierra Nevada, causing air to be pulled down in the Sierra Nevada and Reno, destroying or preventing thunderstorms, but the same wind can push air upward against the Virginia Range and other mountain ranges east of Reno, creating powerful thunderstorms.

There are 6.0 days of + highs, 65 days of + highs, 1.6 days with + lows, and 1.9 days with sub- lows annually; the temperature reaches or dips below the freezing point on 122 days, and does not rise above freezing on only 4.1 of those days. In addition, the region is windy throughout the year; observers such as Mark Twain have commented about the "Washoe Zephyr", northwestern Nevada's distinctive wind.

Demographics

As of the census of 2010, there were 225,221 people, 90,924 households, and 51,112 families residing in the city. The population density was 2,186.6 per square mile (844.2/km). There were 102,582 housing units at an average density of 995.9 per square mile (384.5/km). The city's racial makeup was 74.2% White, 2.9% African American, 1.3% Native American, 6.3% Asian, 0.7% Pacific Islander, 10.5% some other race, and 4.2% from two or more races. Hispanic or Latino people of any race were 24.3% of the population. Non-Hispanic Whites were 62.5% of the population in 2010, down from 88.5% in 1980.

At the 2010 census, there were 90,924 households, of which 29.8% had children under the age of 18 living with them, 38.4% were headed by married couples living together, 11.8% had a female householder with no husband present, and 43.8% were non-families. 32.1% of all households were made up of individuals, and 9.7% were someone living alone who was 65 years of age or older. The average household size was 2.43, and the average family size was 3.10.

In the city, the 2010 population was spread out, with 22.8% under the age of 18, 12.5% from 18 to 24, 28.2% from 25 to 44, 24.9% from 45 to 64, and 11.7% who were 65 years of age or older. The median age was 34.6 years. For every 100 females, there were 103.4 males. For every 100 females age 18 and over, there were 102.7 males.

In 2011 the city's estimated median household income was $44,846, and the median family income was $53,896. Males had a median income of $42,120 versus $31,362 for females. The city's per capita income was $25,041. About 9.6% of families and 14.4% of the population were below the poverty line, including 15.1% of those under age 18 and 12.8% of those age 65 or over. The population was 180,480 at the 2000 census; in 2010, its population had risen to 225,221, making it the third-largest city in the state after Las Vegas and Henderson, and the largest outside Clark County. Reno shares its eastern border with the city of Sparks and is the larger of the principal cities of the Reno–Sparks, Nevada Metropolitan Statistical Area (MSA), a metropolitan area that covers Storey and Washoe counties. The MSA had a combined population of 425,417 at the 2010 census. The MSA is combined with the Fernley Micropolitan Statistical Area and the Carson City MSA to form the Reno-Carson City-Fernley Combined Statistical Area, which had a population of 477,397 at the 2010 census.

Economy

Until the 1960s, Reno was the gambling capital of the United States, but Las Vegas' rapid growth, American Airlines' 2000 buyout of Reno Air, and the growth of Native American gaming in California have reduced its gambling economy. Older casinos were torn down (Mapes Hotel, Fitzgerald's Nevada Club, Primadonna, Horseshoe Club, Harold's Club, Palace Club), or smaller casinos like the Comstock, Sundowner, Golden Phoenix, Kings Inn, Money Tree, Virginian, and Riverboat were either closed or were converted into residential units.

Because of its location, Reno has traditionally drawn the majority of its California tourists and gamblers from the San Francisco Bay Area and Sacramento while Las Vegas has historically served more tourists from Southern California and the Phoenix area.

Several local large hotel casinos have shown significant growth and have moved gaming further away from the downtown core. These larger hotel casinos are the Atlantis, the Peppermill and the Grand Sierra Resort. The Peppermill was chosen as the most outstanding Reno gaming/hotel property by Casino Player and Nevada magazines. In 2005, the Peppermill Reno began a $300 million Tuscan-themed expansion.

Reno holds several events throughout the year to draw tourists to the area. They include Hot August Nights (a classic car convention), Street Vibrations (a motorcycle fan gathering and rally), The Great Reno Balloon Race, a Cinco de Mayo celebration, bowling tournaments (held in the National Bowling Stadium), and the Reno Air Races.

Several large commercial developments were constructed during the mid-2000s boom, such as The Summit in 2007 and Legends at Sparks Marina in 2008.

Reno is the location of the corporate headquarters for several companies, including Braeburn Capital, Hamilton, Server Technology, EE Technologies, Caesars Entertainment, and Port of Subs.  Companies based in the Reno metropolitan area include Sierra Nevada Corporation and U.S. Ordnance. International Game Technology, Bally Technologies and GameTech have a development and manufacturing presence.

Since the turn of the 21st century, greater Reno saw an influx of technology companies entering the area, following major initiatives and investments by investors from Seattle & the Bay Area. The first one in 1999 was Amazon.com in Fernley. After the Great Recession, the state placed an increased focus on economic development. Thousands of new jobs were created.

The Tesla Gigafactory at the Tahoe Reno Industrial Center is the largest building in the world, purportedly covering 5.8 million square feet.

The arrival of several data centers at the Tahoe Reno Industrial Center is further diversifying a region that was best known for distribution and logistics outside gaming and tourism. Switch's new SuperNAP campus at the Tahoe Reno Industrial Center is shaping up to be the largest data center in the world once completed. Apple is expanding its data center at the adjacent Reno Technology Park and recently built a warehouse on land in downtown Reno. Rackspace is also building a $422 million data center next to Apple.

The greater Reno area also hosts distribution facilities for Amazon, Walmart, PetSmart and Zulily.

Top employers
According to Reno's 2016 Comprehensive Annual Financial Report, the top employers in the city are:

Healthcare 

Reno has several healthcare facilities. Many are affiliated with the University of Nevada Reno School of Medicine.

 Northern Nevada Medical Center 
 Northern Nevada Sierra Medical Center
 Renown Regional Medical Center
 Saint Mary's Regional Medical Center
 University of Nevada Reno School of Medicine
 Veteran's Administration Sierra Nevada Healthcare System Reno, Nevada

Arts and culture 

Reno has several museums. The Nevada Museum of Art is the only American Alliance of Museums (AAM) accredited art museum in Nevada. The National Automobile Museum contains 200 cars that were from the collection of William F. Harrah, including Elvis Presley's 1973 Cadillac Eldorado.

Reno also hosts a number of music venues, such as the Pioneer Center for the Performing Arts, the Reno Philharmonic Orchestra, and the Reno Pops Orchestra. The Reno Youth Symphony Orchestra (YSO), affiliated with the Reno Philharmonic, gives talented youth the opportunity to play advanced music and perform nationwide. In 2016 they had the honor of performing at Carnegie Hall. A.V.A. Ballet Theatre is the resident ballet company of the Pioneer Center for the Performing Arts. All of their classical performances are with the Reno Philharmonic Orchestra.

Every July, Reno celebrates Artown, a visual and performing arts festival that lasts the entire month of July throughout the city. Along with performances, Artown partners with other institutions throughout the Reno Tahoe area to hold workshops, camps, and classes for all ages. All events are free of charge or low cost.

Reno has a public library, a branch of the Washoe County Library System. The Downtown branch of the Washoe County Library was listed on the National Register of Historic Places in 2013.

Sports

Reno is home to the Reno Aces, the minor league baseball Triple-A affiliate of the Arizona Diamondbacks, playing in Greater Nevada Field, a downtown ballpark opened in 2009. Reno has hosted multiple professional baseball teams in the past, most under the Reno Silver Sox name. The Reno Astros, a former professional, unaffiliated baseball team, played at Moana Stadium until 2009.

In basketball, the Reno Bighorns of the NBA G League played at the Reno Events Center from 2008 to 2018. They were primarily an affiliate of the Sacramento Kings throughout its existence. The Sacramento Kings bought the team in 2016 and moved the franchise to become the Stockton Kings in 2018.

Reno is host to both amateur and professional combat sporting events such as mixed martial arts and boxing. The "Fight of the Century" between Jack Johnson and James J. Jeffries was held in Reno in 1910. Boxer Ray Mancini fought four of his last five fights in Reno against Bobby Chacon, Livingstone Bramble, Héctor Camacho, and Greg Haugen.

Reno expected to be the future home of an ECHL ice hockey team, named the Reno Raiders, but construction on a suitable arena never began. The franchise was dormant since 1998, when it was named the Reno Rage, and earlier the Reno Renegades, and played in the now-defunct West Coast Hockey League (WCHL). In 2016, Reno was removed from the ECHL's Future Markets page.

The Reno–Tahoe Open is northern Nevada's only PGA Tour event, held at Montrêux Golf & Country Club in Reno. As part of the FedEx Cup, the tournament follows 132 PGA Tour professionals competing for a share of the event's $3 million purse. The Reno-Tahoe Open Foundation has donated more than $1.8 million to local charities.

Reno has a college sports scene, with the Nevada Wolf Pack appearing in football bowl games and an Associated Press and Coaches Poll Top Ten ranking in basketball in 2018.

In 2004, the city completed a $1.5 million whitewater park on the Truckee River in downtown Reno which hosts whitewater events throughout the year. The course runs Class 2 and 3 rapids with year-round public access.

Reno is home to two roller derby teams, the Battle Born Derby Demons and the Reno Roller Girls. The Battle Born Derby Demons compete on flat tracks locally and nationally. They are the only derby team locally to compete in a national Derby league.

Reno is the home of the National Bowling Stadium, which hosts the United States Bowling Congress (USBC) Open Championships every three years.

List of teams

Minor professional teams

Amateur teams

College teams

Parks and recreation

Reno is home to a variety of recreation activities including both seasonal and year-round. In the summer, Reno locals can be found near three major bodies of water: Lake Tahoe, the Truckee River, and Pyramid Lake. The Truckee River originates at Lake Tahoe and flows west to east through the center of downtown Reno before terminating at Pyramid Lake to the north. The river is a major part of Artown, held in the summer at Wingfield Park. Washoe Lake is a popular kite and windsurfing location because of its high wind speeds during the summer.

Skiing and snowboarding are among the most popular winter sports and draw many tourists. Other popular Reno winter activities include snowshoeing, ice skating, and snowmobiling. There are many bike paths to ride in the summer time. Lake Tahoe hosts international bike competitions each summer.

Air races

The Reno Air Races, also known as the National Championship Air Races, are held each September at the Reno Stead Airport.

Government
Reno has a democratic municipal government. The city council is the core of the government, with seven members. Five of these council people represent districts of Reno, and are vetted in the primary by the citizens of each district. In general, the top two vote earners in each ward make the ballot for the citywide election. The other two council members are the at-large member, who represents the entire city, and the mayor, who is elected by the people of the city. The council has several duties, including setting priorities for the city, promoting communication with the public, planning development, and redevelopment.

There is an elected city attorney who is responsible for civil and criminal cases. The City Attorney represents the city government in court, and prosecutes misdemeanors.

The city's charter calls for a council-manager form of government, meaning the council appoints only two positions, the city manager, who implements and enforces the policies and programs the council approves, and the city clerk. The city manager is in charge of the budget and workforce for all city programs. The city clerk, who records the proceedings of the council, makes appointments for the council, and makes sure efficient copying and printing services are available.

In 2010, there was a ballot question asking whether the Reno city government and the Washoe County government should explore the idea of becoming one combined governmental body. Fifty-four percent of voters approved of the ballot measure to make an inquiry into consolidating the governments.

Fire department
The city of Reno is protected by the Reno Fire Department (RFD) manning 14 fire stations.

The Reno Fire Department (RFD) provides all-risk emergency service to the City of Reno residents. All-risk emergency service is the national model of municipal fire departments, providing the services needed in the most efficient way possible.

The department provides paramedic-level service to the citizens and visitors of Reno. This is the highest level of emergency medical care available in the field.

In addition to responding to fires, whether they occur in structures, vegetation/brush or vehicles, the fire department also provides rescue capabilities for almost any type of emergency situation.

This includes quick and efficient emergency medical care for the citizens; a hazardous materials team capable of identifying unknown materials and controlling a release disaster; and preparedness and management of large-scale incidents.

Maintaining this level of service requires nearly constant training of personnel. This training maintains both the skills needed to operate safely in emergency environments and the physical fitness necessary to reduce the likelihood and severity of injuries.

The minimum annual-training requirement to maintain firefighting and medical skills is 240 hours per year. Special teams and company-level drills add significantly to that number of hours.

Education

Universities and colleges

 The University of Nevada, Reno is the oldest university in Nevada and Nevada System of Higher Education. In 1886, the state university, previously only a college preparatory school, moved from Elko in remote northeastern Nevada to north of downtown Reno, where it became a full-fledged state college. The university grew slowly over the decades, but it now has an enrollment of 21,353, with most students from within Nevada. Its specialties include mining engineering, agriculture, journalism, business, and one of only two Basque Studies programs in the nation. It houses the National Judicial College. The university was named one of the top 200 colleges in the nation in the most recent U.S. News & World Report National Universities category index.
 Truckee Meadows Community College (TMCC) is a regionally accredited, two-year institution which is part of the Nevada System of Higher Education. The college has approximately 13,000 students attending classes at a primary campus and four satellite centers. It offers a wide range of academic and university transfer programs, occupational training, career enhancement workshops, and other classes. TMCC offers associate of arts, associate of science, associate of applied science or associate of general studies degrees, one-year certificates, or certificates of completion in more than 50 career fields, including architecture, auto/diesel mechanics, criminal justice, dental hygiene, graphic design, musical theatre, nursing, and welding.
 Career College of Northern Nevada (CCNN) is a nationally accredited trade school that trains students in technical fields that support fast growing industries. The college is locally owned and operated. Employer advisory boards direct the college to provide skill training that is relevant to industry needs.
 University of Phoenix – Northern Nevada Campus is in south Reno. The university faculty is a collection business and academic professionals from the local Reno area.
 The Nevada School of Law at Old College in Reno was the first law school established in the state of Nevada. Its doors were open from 1981 to 1988.

Public schools
Public education is provided by the Washoe County School District.
 Reno has twelve public high schools: Damonte Ranch, Galena, Hug, North Valleys High School, McQueen, Academy of Arts, Careers, and Technology (AACT), Reno, Truckee Meadows Community College High School, Innovations, and Wooster.
 There are three public high schools in neighboring Sparks, attended by many students who live in Reno: Reed, Spanish Springs, and Sparks High School.
 Reno-Sparks has 15 middle schools: Billinghurst, Clayton, Cold Springs, Depoali, Dilworth, Herz, Mendive, O'Brien, Pine, Shaw, Sky Ranch, Sparks, Swope, Traner, and Vaughn.
 Reno-Sparks has 65 elementary schools: Allen, Anderson, Beasley, Jesse Beck, Bennett, Booth, Brown, Cannan, Caughlin Ranch, Corbett, Desert Heights, Diedrichsen, Dodson, Donner Springs, Double Diamond, Drake, Duncan, Katherine Dunn, Elmcrest, Gomes, Grace Warner, Greenbrae, Hidden Valley, Huffaker, Hunsberger, Hunter Lake, Jesse Beck, John C Bohach, Johnson, Juniper, Lemmon Valley, Elizabeth Lenz, Lincoln Park, Echo Loder, Mathews, Maxwell, Melton, Mitchell, Moss, Mount Rose, Natchez, Palmer, Peavine, Picollo Special Education School, Pleasant Valley, Risley, Roy Gomm, Sepulveda, Sierra Vista, Silver Lake, Alice Smith, Kate Smith, Smithridge, Spanish Springs, Stead, Sun Valley, Taylor, Towles, Van Gorder, Verdi [pronounced VUR-die], Veterans Memorial, Warner, Westergard, Whitehead, and Sarah Winnemucca. (some schools included on this list are in Sparks)

Public charter schools
Reno has many charter schools, which include Academy for Career Education, serving grades 10–12, opened 2002; Alpine Academy Charter High School, serving grades 9–12, opened 2009; Bailey Charter Elementary School, serving grades K-6, opened 2001; Coral Academy of Science, serving grades K-12; Davidson Academy, serving grades 6–12, opened 2006; High Desert Montessori School, serving grades PreK-7, opened 2002; I Can Do Anything Charter School, serving grades 9–12, opened 2000; Rainshadow Community Charter High School, serving grades 9–12, opened 2003; Sierra Nevada Academy Charter School, serving grades PreK-8, opened 1999; and TEAM A (Together Everyone Achieves More Academy), serving grades 9–12, opened 2004.

Private schools
Reno has a few private elementary schools such as Legacy Christian School, Excel Christian School, St. Nicholas Orthodox Academy, Lamplight Christian School, and Nevada Sage Waldorf School as well as private high schools, the largest of which are Bishop Manogue High School and Sage Ridge School.

Infrastructure

Transportation

Roads
Reno was historically served by the Victory Highway and a branch of the Lincoln Highway. After the formation of the U.S. Numbered Highways system, U.S. Route 40 was routed along 4th Street through downtown Reno, before being replaced by Interstate 80. The primary north–south highway through Reno is U.S. Route 395/Interstate 580.

Bus
The Regional Transportation Commission of Washoe County (RTC) has a bus system that provides intracity buses, intercity buses to Carson City, and an on-demand shuttle service for disabled persons. The system has its main terminal on 4th Street in downtown Reno and secondary terminals in Sparks and at Meadowood Mall in south Reno.

Numerous shuttle and excursion services are offered connecting the Reno–Tahoe International Airport to various destinations:
 North Lake Tahoe Express provides connecting shuttle service to North Lake Tahoe Resorts
 South Tahoe Airporter provides connecting shuttle service to South Lake Tahoe resorts.
 Eastern Sierra Transit Authority provides shuttles to destinations south along the US-395 corridor in California, such as Mammoth Mountain and Lancaster
 Modoc Sage Stage provides shuttles to Alturas and Susanville, California, along the northern US-395 corridor.
 Salt Lake Express provides service to Las Vegas mainly along the southern US-95 corridor.

Greyhound stops at a downtown terminal. Megabus stopped at the Silver Legacy Reno, but has since discontinued service to Reno.

Rail

Reno was historically a stopover along the First transcontinental railroad; the modern Overland Route continues to run through Reno. Reno was additionally the southern terminus of the Nevada–California–Oregon Railway (NCO) and the northern terminus of the Virginia and Truckee Railroad. Using the NCO depot and right of way, the Western Pacific Railroad also provided rail service to Reno. In the early 20th century, Reno also had a modest streetcar system. Downtown Reno has two historic train depots, the inactive Nevada-California-Oregon Railroad Depot and the active Amtrak depot at Reno station, originally built by the Southern Pacific Railroad.

Amtrak provides daily passenger service to Reno via the California Zephyr at Reno station and via multiple Amtrak Thruway Motorcoaches that connect to trains departing from Sacramento.

Air
The city is served by Reno–Tahoe International Airport, with general aviation traffic handled by Reno Stead Airport. Reno–Tahoe International Airport is the second busiest commercial airport in the state of Nevada after Harry Reid International Airport in Las Vegas. Reno was the hub and headquarters of the defunct airline Reno Air.

Utilities
The Truckee Meadows Water Authority provides potable water for the city. The Truckee River is the primary water source, with purification occurring at two plants, Chalk Bluff and Glendale. The Chalk Bluff plant's main intakes are west of Reno and south of Verdi, with the water flowing through a series of flumes and ditches to the plant. Alternative intakes are below the plant along the banks of the Truckee River itself. The Glendale plant is alongside the river, and is fed by a rock and concrete rubble diversion dam a short distance upstream.

Sewage treatment for most of the Truckee Meadows region takes place at the Truckee Meadows Water Reclamation Facility at the eastern edge of the valley. Treated effluent returns to the Truckee River by way of Steamboat Creek.

NV Energy, formerly Sierra Pacific, provides electric power and natural gas. Power comes from multiple sources, including Tracy-Clark Station to the east, and the Steamboat Springs binary cycle power plants at the southern end of town.

Notable people

In popular culture 
Movies filmed in Reno include:
 The Cooler
 Magnolia
 Hard Eight
 Charley Varrick
 Into the Wild
 Desert Hearts
 The Wizard
 Jinxed!
 The Misfits
 Kingpin
 ...All the Marbles
 Pink Cadillac
 Diamonds
 Sister Act
 Father's Day
 Waking Up in Reno
 Austin Powers in Goldmember
 Jane Austen's Mafia!
 40 Pounds of Trouble
 California Split
 Up Close & Personal
 The Pledge
 Kill Me Again
 The Last Don
 Ocean's Eleven
 Andy Hardy's Blonde Trouble
 Blind Fury
 Melvin and Howard
 Mr. Belvedere Goes to College
 Scarecrow
 Wild Is the Wind
 Born to Kill
 The Muppets
 Promised Land
 The Motel Life
 5 Against the House

Music videos filmed in Reno include:

 Drive Slow – Kanye West
 Little Motel – Modest Mouse
 Take Me Home Tonight – Eddie Money
 Send The Pain Below - Chevelle
 Folsom Prison Blues-Johnny Cash

Twin towns – sister cities
Reno's sister cities are:
 Hatzor HaGlilit, Israel
 San Sebastián, Spain
 Taichung, Taiwan
 Udon Thani, Thailand
 Wirral, England, United Kingdom
 Nalchik, Russian Federation

See also

 USS Reno (CL-96)

Notes

References

Bibliography

 Benson, Heather Lené. "In Place/Out of Place: Punjabi-Sikhs in Reno, Nevada" (PhD dissertation, University of Nevada, Reno, 2022) online.
 
  + Chronology
 Harpster, Jack. The Genesis of Reno: The History of the Riverside Hotel and the Virginia Street Bridge (University of Nevada Press, 2016).
 Moehring, Eugene P. Reno, Las Vegas, and the Strip: A Tale of Three Cities (University of Nevada Press, 2014).
 Moreno, Richard. A short history of Reno (University of Nevada Press, 2015).
 
 Ringhoff, Mary, and Edward Stoner. The river and the railroad: An archaeological history of Reno (University of Nevada Press, 2011).

External links

 City of Reno official website
 Reno Historical app (Nevada Humanities)
 

 
1868 establishments in Nevada
Articles containing video clips
Cities in Nevada
Cities in Washoe County, Nevada
County seats in Nevada
Gambling in Nevada
Populated places established in 1868
Populated riverside places in the United States
.